Nong Phueng is a tambon (subdistrict) of Saraphi District, in Chiang Mai Province, Thailand. In 2020 it had a total population of 15,778 people.

Administration

Central administration
The tambon is subdivided into 8 administrative villages (muban).

Local administration
The area of the subdistrict is shared by 2 local governments.
the subdistrict municipality (Thesaban Tambon) Yang Noeng (เทศบาลตำบลยางเนิ้ง)
the subdistrict municipality (Thesaban Tambon) Nong Phueng (เทศบาลตำบลหนองผึ้ง)

References

External links
Thaitambon.com on Nong Phueng

Tambon of Chiang Mai province
Populated places in Chiang Mai province